The Art Institute of Dallas in Dallas, Texas, United States, is a for-profit  private college owned and operated by Miami International University of Art & Design. The Art Institute of Dallas offers associate's degree and bachelor's degree programs for fashion design, fashion marketing management, interior design, graphic design, media arts & animation, advertising design, baking & pastry, photography, web design & interactive media, digital filmmaking & video production, audio production and culinary arts.

History
The Art Institute of Dallas was established in 1964 as the Dallas Fashion Merchandising College. It was later renamed in 1978 to the Fashion and Art Institute of Dallas. A year later, the Institute was approved to grant an Associate of Applied Arts Degree. In 1984, the Institute was acquired by the Education Management Corporation (EDMC) to join The Art Institutes, and now bears its current name The Art Institute of Dallas. EDMC expanded The Art Institutes by investing in facilities and equipment, adding personnel to faculty and student services, and establishing a national marketing presence. In 1988, The Art Institute of Dallas moved to its present facility in North Dallas.

On October 18, 2017 EDMC announced it completed the sale of 31 Art Institute Schools, including The Art Institute of Dallas, to the Dream Center Foundation. Subsequently, ownership passed to Miami International University of Art & Design.

Degree programs

Design
 Certificate in Culinary Arts
 Certificate in Baking & Pastry
 Associate of Applied Science in Baking & Pastry
 Associate of Applied Science in Culinary Arts
 Associate of Applied Science in Restaurant & Catering Management
 Associate of Applied Science in Video Production
 Associate of Applied Arts in Fashion Design
 Associate of Applied Arts in Graphic Design
 Bachelor of Fine Arts in Advertising Design
 Bachelor of Fine Arts in Digital Filmmaking & Video Production
 Bachelor of Fine Arts in Fashion Design
 Bachelor of Fine Arts in Fashion Marketing & Management
 Bachelor of Fine Arts in Game Art & Design
 Bachelor of Fine Arts in Graphic & Web Design
 Bachelor of Fine Arts in Interior Design
 Bachelor of Fine Arts in Media Arts & Animation
 Bachelor of Science in Audio Production
 Bachelor of Science in Culinary Management
 Master of Arts in Design & Media Management

References

External links
Official Page
Mildred M. Kelley Library at The Art Institute of Dallas

Dallas
Art schools in Texas
Animation schools in the United States
Private universities and colleges in Texas
Universities and colleges in Dallas
Educational institutions established in 1964
Universities and colleges accredited by the Southern Association of Colleges and Schools
1964 establishments in Texas